Franche-Comté (Frainc-Comtou: Fraintche-Comtè; ; also ; ; all ) is a cultural and historical region of eastern France. It is composed of the modern departments of Doubs, Jura, Haute-Saône and the Territoire de Belfort. In 2016, its population was 1,180,397.

From 1956 to 2015, the Franche-Comté was a French administrative region. Since 1 January 2016, it has been part of the new region Bourgogne-Franche-Comté.

In 2016, these two-halves of the historic Kingdom of Burgundy were reunited, as the region of Bourgogne-Franche-Comté. It is also the 6th biggest region in France. The name "Franche-Comté" is feminine because the word "comté" in the past was generally feminine, although today it is masculine.

The principal cities are the capital Besançon, Belfort and Montbéliard. Other important cities are Dole (the capital before the region was conquered by Louis XIV in the late seventeenth century), Vesoul (capital of Haute-Saône), Arbois (the "wine capital" of the Jura), and Lons-le-Saunier (the capital of Jura).

History
The region has been inhabited since the Paleolithic age and was occupied by the Gauls. It was then heavily settled by Germanic peoples during the Germanic migrations, most notably the Burgundians, who settled in the region after the Gauls had vacated the area. Later, it was part of the territory of the Alemanni in the fifth century, then the Kingdom of Burgundy from 457 to 534. The Burgundians adopted Orthodox Christianity, Christianizing the region. In 534, it became part of the Frankish kingdom. In 561 it was included in the Merovingian Kingdom of Burgundy under Guntram, the third son of Clotaire I. In 613, Clotaire II reunited the Frankish Kingdom under his rule, and the region remained a part of the Kingdom of Burgundy under the later Merovingians and Carolingians.

County of Burgundy 
The name  or Freigrafschaft Burgund in German (Free County of Burgundy) did not appear officially until 1366. It had been a territory of the County of Burgundy from 888, the province becoming subject to the Holy Roman Empire in 1034. It was definitively separated from the neighboring Duchy of Burgundy upon the latter's incorporation into the Kingdom of France in 1477. That year at the Battle of Nancy during the Burgundian Wars, the last duke, Charles the Bold, was killed in battle. Although the county, along with the Duchy, was seized by King Louis XI of France, in 1492 his son Charles VIII ceded it to Philip of Austria, the grandson and heir of Charles the Bold. When Philip's son, Emperor Charles V, inherited the Spanish throne in 1516, the Franche-Comté, along with the rest of the Burgundian lands, passed to the Spanish.

Province of the Kingdom of France

Franche-Comté was captured by France in 1668, but returned to Spain under the Treaty of Aix-la-Chapelle. It was conquered a second time in 1674, and finally was ceded to France in the Treaty of Nijmegen (1678). Enclaves such as Montbéliard remained outside French control.

The Franche-Comté was one of the last parts of France to have serfdom. In 1784, half of the population consisted of serfs, accounting for 400,000 out of the 1 million French serfs. Landowners took one-twelfth of the sale's price if a serf (mainmortable) wanted to sell up. Serfs were not forced to stay on the land, but the lord could claim droit de suite, whereby a peasant who died away from his holding left it to the lord, even if he had heirs. A runaway serf's land was forfeit after ten years. Louis XVI issued a decree banning these practices on 8 August 1779, but the Parlement of Besançon blocked this until 1787.

After 1790
The population of the region fell by a fifth from 1851 to 1946, reflecting low French natural growth and migration to more urbanized parts of the country. Most of the decline occurred in Haute-Saône and Jura, which remain among the country's more agriculture-dependent areas.

Environment
This region borders Switzerland and shares much of its architecture, cuisine, and culture with its neighbour. Between the Vosges range of mountains to the north and the Jura range to the south, the landscape consists of rolling cultivated fields, dense pine forest, and rampart-like mountains. Not so majestic as the Alps, the Jura mountains are more accessible and are France's first cross-country skiing area. It is also a superb place to hike, and there are some fine nature trails on the more gentle slopes. The Doubs and Loue valleys, with their timbered houses perched on stilts in the river, and the high valley of Ain, are popular visitor areas. The  is a land of gorges and waterfalls dotted with tiny villages, each with a domed belfry decorated with mosaic of tiles or slates or beaten from metal. The lakes are perfect for swimming in the warmer months. The summits of Haut Jura have wonderful views across  (Lake Geneva) and toward the Alps.

Forty percent of the region's GDP is dependent on manufacturing activities, and most of its production is exported. Construction of automobiles and their parts is one of the most buoyant industries there. Forestry exploitation is steadily growing, and 38% of the agriculture is dairy and 17% cattle farming. The region has a large and lucrative cheese-making industry, with 40 million tonnes of cheese produced here each year, much of which is made by fruitières (traditional cheese dairies of Franche-Comté); for instance, Comté cheese comes from this region.

Geology 
 Vosges and Jura coal mining basins

Principal cities

Language
Among the regional languages of France, the term Franc-comtois refers to two dialects of two different languages. Franc-comtois is the name of the dialect of Langue d'Oïl spoken by people in the northern part of the region. The dialect of Arpitan has been spoken in its southern part since as early as the thirteenth century (the southern two-thirds of Jura and the southern third of Doubs). Both are recognized as languages of France.

People from Franche-Comté

 Raymond Blanc, chef
 Jean-Jacques Boissard, neo-Latin poet
 Paul de Casteljau, mathematician
 Gustave Courbet, painter
 Frank Darabont, filmmaker
 Charles Fourier, philosopher
 Salah Gaham, concierge
 Victor Hugo, poet, playwright, novelist, essayist, visual artist, statesman, human rights activist
 Auguste and Louis Lumière, early filmmakers
 Jean Mairet, dramatist
 Jacques de Molay, last Grandmaster of the Knights Templar
 Charles Nodier, author
 Louis Pasteur, chemist and microbiologist
 Antoine Perrenot de Granvelle, Burgundian statesman, leading minister of the Spanish Habsburgs
 Nicolas Perrenot de Granvelle, minister of justice under Charles V, Holy Roman Emperor
 Pierre-Joseph Proudhon philosopher, socialist
 Jean Baptiste Alexandre Strolz
 Jean-Baptiste-Antoine Suard, journalist
 Hubert-Félix Thiéfaine, singer and songwriter
 Louis Vuitton, designer
 Arnaud Courlet de Vregille, painter

Typical regional products
 Wine: Vin jaune, Arbois
 Cheese: Cancoillotte, Bleu de Gex, Comté, Édel de Cléron, Metton, Morbier, Munster, Vacherin Mont d'Or
 Sausages: Saucisse de Montbéliard, saucisse de Morteau, Gendarme

References

External links

 Franche-Comté : land of contrasts - Official French website (in English)
 Conseil régional de Franche-Comté Official website
 Franche-Comté directory search engine

 
NUTS 2 statistical regions of the European Union
Former regions of France